The Battle of Shusha (Armenian: Shushi) was the first significant military victory by Armenian forces during the First Nagorno-Karabakh War. The battle took place in the strategically important mountain town of Shusha on the evening of May 8, 1992, and fighting swiftly concluded the next day after Armenian forces captured it and drove out the defending Azerbaijanis. Armenian military commanders based in Nagorno-Karabakh's capital of Stepanakert had been contemplating capturing the town after Azerbaijani shelling of Stepanakert from Shusha for half a year had led to hundreds of Armenian civilian casualties and mass destruction in Stepanakert.

The capture of the town proved decisive. Shusha was the most important military stronghold that Azerbaijan held in Nagorno-Karabakh – its loss marked a turning point in the war, and led to a series of military victories by Armenian forces in the course of the conflict.

Background 

In February 1988, Nagorno-Karabakh had been an autonomous oblast for over sixty years within the borders of the Azerbaijan SSR, though with a majority Armenian population. Following its government's decision to secede from Azerbaijan and re-unify with Armenia, the conflict erupted into a larger scale ethnic feud between Armenians and Azerbaijanis living in the Soviet Union. After the Soviet Union collapsed in 1991, the Armenians and Azerbaijanis vied to take control of Karabakh with full-scale battles in the winter of 1992. By then, the enclave had declared its independence and set up an unrecognized, though self-functioning, government.

The advanced weaponry of tanks, armored fighting vehicles, fighter jets and helicopter gunships bought and used by both sides illustrated the emergence of the free-for-all weapons vacuum that appeared as the Soviet Union disintegrated. A large scale population shift had also been in effect since the conflict began, with most of the Armenians living in Azerbaijan fleeing to Armenia and the Azerbaijanis in Armenia to Azerbaijan. The battle was preceded by the controversial capture of the town and the location of Karabakh's only airport in Khojaly by Armenians in February 1992. With the loss of Khojaly, Azerbaijani commanders concentrated the rest of their firepower upon Stepanakert, which Shusha overlooked.

On 26 January 1992 the Azerbaijani forces stationed in Shusha encircled and attacked nearby Armenian village Karintak (located on the way from Shusha to Stepanakert) attempting to capture it. This operation was conducted by Azerbaijan's then defence minister Tajedin Mekhtiev and was supposed to prepare ground for future attack on Stepanakert. The operation failed as the villagers and the Armenian fighters strongly retaliated in self-defense. Mekhtiev was ambushed and up to seventy Azerbaijani soldiers died. After this debacle, Mekhtiev left Shusha and was fired as defence minister. The Armenians to date celebrate the self-defence of Karintak as one of their early and most decisive victories.

Shusha as base for shelling Stepanakert 

Shusha sits on a mountaintop overlooking the NKR's highly populated capital, Stepanakert (just 5 km away), from an elevation of 600m. An old fortress with high walls, the town is five kilometers (four miles) to the south of Stepanakert and perched on a mountaintop with limited vehicular access. From a geographical standpoint Shusha was well-suited for Azerbaijani shelling of Stepanakert. The main type of artillery used in the bombardment, which began on January 10, 1992, was the Soviet-made BM-21 GRAD multiple rocket launcher, which was capable of firing 40 rockets in one volley. The GRAD launcher was similar to the World War II-era Katyusha in that it did not have a guided missile system and hence the location of where it would hit was difficult to determine. Dubbed "flying telephone poles" due to their long, shaped charges, the missiles caused devastating damage to buildings including the destruction of residential houses, schools, the city's silk factory, and its maternity hospital.

Shusha was the main fire point from where Stepanakert was assaulted. Once the region's Communist Party headquarters and largest city with a population of 70,000, the fighting and shelling had driven away nearly 20,000 of Stepanakert's residents and forced the remainder to live underground in basements. By one tally recorded in early April, a total of 157 rockets had landed on the city in a single day. By early 1992 the bombing intensified. In a course of one week the city was bombed with over 1,000 shells (800 of which were reactive shells). On February 23, ten servicemen in the Russian-led CIS 366th Motorized Rifle Regiment (of the 23rd Motor Rifle Division, 4th Army) headquartered in Stepanakert, tasked with maintaining peace between the Armenians and Azerbaijanis, were injured and one was killed in a bombardment by artillery.

Altogether, over 2,000 civilians were killed and thousands more injured in the bombardment in 1992; moreover, the city's infrastructure was completely devastated with the destruction of sewage networks, water pipes, gas and electricity. In an article that appeared in Time in April 1992, it was noted that "scarcely a single building [had] escaped damage in Stepanakert."

In addition to the shelling, the Azerbaijani military also launched air raids and staged several ground attacks on the outskirts of Stepanakert in hopes of later moving on to capture the city itself. While they were staved off numerous times, the city's leaders complained that military action had to be taken to relieve it from the continuous bombardment. On April 27, the military leaders' plans were approved to move in and capture Shusha.

The battle

Preparation 

Planning for the military operation began under the auspices of Colonel-General Gurgen Dalibaltayan with guidance from Arkady Ter-Tadevosyan. All military factors were in favor of the Azerbaijani Army. The Azerbaijanis had advantage in terms of the quantity and the quality of military equipment; they held numerical superiority and the high ground and, due to the strategic position of Shusha, the town could be easily defended. Therefore, direct attack by was not a viable option for Dalibaltayan. Furthermore, according to military conventions and practices, for the operation to be successful, the attacking party should outnumber the defenders by at least 3 – 4 times (even more when attacking an elevation), while the NKR Detachments simply did not have such manpower at the time. Instead, in conjunction with the commander who would lead the troops into Shusha, Arkady "Komandos" Ter-Tadevosyan, they devised a strategy of launching several diversionary attacks against the adjacent villages to draw out the town's defenders. In the meantime, the forces would encircle and cut off the town from further reinforcements.

Order of battle 

The plan was put together in March – April 1992, after the intelligence data about the location, positions and the number of the rival forces had been finalized. By the commission of L. Martirosov, a model of Shusha area was made, enabling the commanders to define their actions and directions. The plan was developed in top secrecy. On April 28 the main directions of the operation, the commanders, the resources at hand were finalized and defined.

The military order of Shusha seizure was signed on May 4, 1992, with the following details:
1. The enemy holds the surrounding positions

 in Shusha elevations with a human resource of 1200,
 in Zarslu – of about 100,
 in Lisagor – of about 300 – 350,
 in Kesalar – of about 300.

2. Our task is:

 a) To defeat the enemy in Lisagor, Zaralu, Janasan, Karagyav;
 b) To defeat the enemy at Shusha approaches, to gain Shusha and to free the city from the Greens (codename for the enemy);
 c) to further advance to Berdadzor and free the Berdadzor district from the Greens;
 d) The enemy has concentrated the main forces in Kesalar, Lisagor, Zarslu, in surroundings of Shusha and circled the whole city. The ways for defeating the enemy: to gain high point N and take position there.

After regrouping of forces to advance to Lisagor and Zarslu and to immediately start the attack in four directions:

   a) Direction of Shosh /eastern/, commander – A. Karapetyan
   b) Direction of “26”/northern/, commander – V. Chitchyan
   c) Lachin direction /southern/, commander – S. Babayan
   d) Kesalar direction /north-eastern/, commander – Seyran Ohanyan,
   commander of reserve troops – Y. HovhannisyanTo defeat the enemy from Stepanakert side at three Shusha edges, then to destroy the enemy and liberate Shusha.''

Before the offensive against the Shusha citadel was launched, Ter-Tadevosyan's forces launched an artillery barrage from several directions for several weeks in order to "soften up" the town's defenses. Since late February, the Azerbaijani military had been reinforcing Shusha's ridge and ammunition, and had been shuttling in helicopters in order to evacuate the town's civilian population. The attack was to start on May 4, but for various reasons (lack of ammunition, adverse weather conditions, etc.) it was delayed. By May 8, Armenian forces had amassed a force of nearly 1,000 fighters to storm Shusha.

The offensive 

In the twilight hours of May 8, Ter-Tadevosyan directed his forces to assail Shusha from different directions and attack it from the flanks and its rear to avoid the ridge facing Stepanakert, which was the town's most easily defendable location. The force was divided into 5 companies, four of which (under the command of Arkady Karapetyan, Valery Chitchyan, Samvel Babayan and Seyran Ohanyan) would attack from different directions, and the fifth (under command of Yura Ovanisyan) would remain as reserve in case any of the groups needed immediate reinforcement. The main contingent of the attacking force was primarily infantry, but was complemented by at least four tanks and two attack helicopters.

Entrenched in Shusha was the Azerbaijani commander Elbrus Orujev, who commanded a force of several hundred men and tanks. Due to the proximity of the attacking forces, the GRAD launchers were largely useless for defending the town. Orujev's forces managed to fend off the first Armenians who scaled the town's cliffs. Orujev's men were bolstered by a Chechen volunteer contingent led by guerrilla warlord Shamil Basayev, who were among the last to leave the city.

By mid-day, the fighting in Shusha escalated into a full-scale engagement, as both sides were involved in fierce combat amidst Shusha's battered streets and near its communications tower. A famous encounter took place between the two sides when an Armenian T-72 tank, the first to enter Shusha, encountered its Azerbaijani counterpart on the northern approach of the town. As the two exchanged fire the Armenian tank, manned by Gagik Avsharyan, was hit by several rounds from the opposing T-72 and knocked out of commission. Two of the tank's crew members were killed but Avsharyan survived. By the evening of May 8, Armenian forces destroyed three of the GRAD launchers and captured the remainder of the battery. Within several hours, the defenders were forced to retreat to the town's southernmost tip.

By May 9 the Armenian forces were firmly in control of Shusha. At the battle-scarred Ghazanchetsots Cathedral they found that the Azerbaijanis had converted it into a storage area for the GRAD ammunition. Overwhelmed by the attacking force, Orujev ordered his forces to retreat and abandon the citadel. Casualty counts were estimated to have been over a hundred on both sides. After capture of the town, the city was looted and burnt by aggrieved Armenian civilians from nearby Stepanakert, who had endured months of bombing and shelling from Azerbaijani forces.

According to the claims of former Azerbaijani residents, some of the shelling was either indiscriminate or intentionally aimed at civilian targets.

Political fallout 

Writer Markar Melkonian, brother of Nagorno Karabakh commander Monte Melkonian, would later write that "the capture of Shusha would go down in the annals of local lore as the most glorious victory" in the first half of the war.

The capture of Shusha ushered many Armenians living in Stepanakert and elsewhere in Karabakh to supplant the majority Azerbaijani population living there before the battle. Several days following the offensive, Armenian forces launched an attack in the region of Lachin and opened up a five-mile corridor connecting the enclave to Armenia proper. The offensive prompted two attacks by Azerbaijan's military. One was concentrated on taking back Shusha on May 11 and the other was further south in Martuni. Despite earlier claims made by Azerbaijan's defense ministry to having taken back Shusha, the offensive had failed. In the Armenian defended front of Martuni, Armenian forces also turned back a retaliatory Azerbaijani offensive while inflicting heavy losses.

On the day of the Armenian victory, Armenian president Levon Ter-Petrosyan and then acting Azerbaijani president Yagub Mamedov were present in Tehran, Iran to sign a cease-fire agreement. News of the Armenian offensive led Mamedov to charge that Armenia had already failed to honor the cease-fire. Ter-Petrosyan, however, contested that he was unable to control what the Armenians in Karabakh were planning. The loss of Shusha later led to mass demonstrations in Azerbaijan's capital of Baku against newly reinstated president Ayaz Mütallibov. Charged for failing to defend the cities of Shusha on 9th and later Lachin on 18th, he was forced to step down. Many Azerbaijanis were in a state of disbelief due to the loss: the town had been the birthplace for Azerbaijani composers, poets and musicians and many felt that the town's capture had been betrayed or sold for political purposes. In a television interview in 2000, Basayev discounted these theories and contended that the town's defenders had simply abandoned their positions.

The city has become one of the central items involved in the negotiating process in peace talks since the war ended in 1994.

Turkey's involvement 

Armenia's western neighbor, Turkey, took umbrage after Armenian troops had captured the town. Süleyman Demirel, Turkey's prime minister, said that he was coming under intense pressure by the Turkish people to send military help to Azerbaijan. The two peoples are ethnically and culturally related. Demirel however decided not to heed their calls partly because the commander of the CIS forces based in Caucasus, Yevgeny Shaposhnikov had warned that such an incursion would lead to "the verge of a third world war, and that cannot be allowed." The Armenian victory in Shusha had many Turkish officials accusing Armenia itself of seeking to invade the Azerbaijani exclave of Nakhchivan.

Because of international pressure, Turkey was ostensibly restricted to providing economic support to Azerbaijan. Nonetheless, the Turkish army and intelligence services launched undercover operations to supply Azerbaijan with arms and military personnel. According to Turkish sources, over 350 high-ranking officers and thousands of volunteers from Turkey participated in the warfare on the Azerbaijani side. Western authors reported several major shipments of weapons from Turkey, including bringing an arsenal of Soviet-made arms from the former East Germany.

Simultaneously, Turkey was engaged in overt intimidation of Armenia. On the international stage it lobbied various organizations and promoted a pro-Azerbaijani bent of mediation and conflict resolution efforts. Turkish diplomats organized "Turkic Summits" for Turkic nations that included Azerbaijan, Kazakhstan, Kyrgyzstan, Turkmenistan, and Uzbekistan to convince the leaders of the Central Asian countries to sever economic ties with Armenia and condemn its military involvement in Nagorno Karabakh.

Commemorations 

After the war ended, Avsharyan's T-72 tank was recovered and repaired and currently stands as a monument in Shusha. May 9 is now celebrated in Armenia and the Nagorno-Karabakh Republic as "The Day of the NKR’s Defence Army" and "The Day of Liberation of Shusha," respectively. A commendation medal was also awarded by the government to those Armenians who participated in the battle.

Fifteenth anniversary 
On May 9, 2007, Armenia and the NKR celebrated the fifteenth anniversary of the town's capture. The festivities included a military parade in Renaissance Square in Stepanakert and a cross-country marathon organized by the Armenian Revolutionary Federation's youth wing that began from Armenia and ended in Shusha during the run up to May 9. During the processions, then president of the NKR Arkadi Ghukasyan, reiterated the point that the citizens of the republic would have the final say over their future.

The parade was headed by the Nagorno-Karabakh Defense Army's first deputy commander, Major General Movses Hakobyan. Attendants of it included veterans of the battle and the First Nagorno-Karabakh War and veterans from the Second World War since May 9 also marks Victory in Europe day.

In Armenia, prime minister Serzh Sargsyan inaugurated the naming of a square in the capital of Yerevan after Shusha.

See also 
 First Nagorno-Karabakh War
 Armenian volunteer units
 Battle of Shusha (2020)

References

External links 

 Medal awarded to Armenian participants of the battle
  Masis.tv – Liberation of Shoushi (documentary)
 General Dalibaltayan describes the liberation of Shushi on YouTube

Battles involving Armenia
Battles involving Azerbaijan
Conflicts in 1992
1992 in Azerbaijan
1992 in Armenia
Battles involving the Republic of Artsakh
First Nagorno-Karabakh War
1992 in the Nagorno-Karabakh Republic
May 1992 events in Asia
Military history of Shusha